Jeremy Nicholas Butterfield FBA (born 1954) is a philosopher at the University of Cambridge, noted particularly for his work on philosophical aspects of quantum theory, relativity theory and classical mechanics.

Biography
Butterfield obtained his Ph.D. from the University of Cambridge in 1984; he was supervised by Hugh Mellor and David Malament. He was a lecturer in the philosophy faculty at Cambridge University and was later promoted to reader in 1997. In 1998, he became a senior research fellow at All Souls College at the University of Oxford; he returned to the University of Cambridge in his present position in 2006. He has held visiting positions at Princeton University, the University of Pittsburgh and the University of Sydney.

Butterfield is a fellow of the British Academy and a senior research fellow of Trinity College, Cambridge. He is a past president of the British Society for the Philosophy of Science, and of the Mind Association. He previously served on the governing board of the Philosophy of Science Association and on the executive committee of the British Philosophical Association. He co-founded the journal Studies in History and Philosophy of Modern Physics, and edited it until 2001. He serves on the editorial boards of several journals and book series.

Research
Butterfield's research centres around a variety of topics in the philosophy of physics and philosophy of science, and he has also made contributions to the philosophy of language and logic, particularly with regard to the treatment of time and tense. In this regard, he has argued in several papers for a detensed theory of time, according to which the present is a merely subjective or indexical notion, on analogy with one's spatial location.

In the philosophy of quantum theory, Butterfield has proposed several clarifications of the notions of locality operative in algebraic quantum field theories (especially 'stochastic Einstein locality'), and has investigated which of these clarified versions of locality hold in those theories.  He has also investigated the impact of the Bell inequalities in the light of Reichenbach's principle of the common cause, and has argued that the violation of these inequalities implies causation between the space-like separated wings of a Bell experiment.  In addition, he has written on the quantum measurement problem, and the implications for it due to, and of it for, the philosophy and science of consciousness. He has also investigated the problems of localizability in relativistic quantum theories, in collaboration with Gordon Fleming.

In the philosophy of spacetime physics, Butterfield has argued for a resolution of Einstein's 1913 hole argument that preserves spacetime substantivalism by utilizing David Lewis's theory of modal counterparts.  More recently, he has appealed to tensor calculus, and its use in much of contemporary physics, to argue against the popular view (propounded by David Lewis) that the world may be described in terms of 'local matters of fact'; i.e. in terms of chiefly intrinsic properties instantiated at spatial or spatio-temporal points.

In the philosophy of classical mechanics, Butterfield has investigated the elimination of descriptively redundant formal elements through symplectic reduction, and the interdependence between conserved quantities and conservation laws.  He has also made several appeals in his work, on classical mechanics and other physical theories, to the importance of an appreciation of modality in physics.

In several papers, Butterfield has collaborated with the theoretical physicist Chris Isham.  These address the role of topos theory in understanding quantum theory (in particular the Kochen–Specker theorem), and the status of time in the various quantum gravity research programmes.

In recent years, Butterfield has argued for a reconciliation of the idea of emergence – the idea that novel structures, not described by "fundamental" theories, appear at a certain level of complexity – with the possibility of inter-theoretic reduction. He has illustrated the reconciliation in various areas such as phase transitions, renormalization, and gauge theories. He has also worked, often in collaboration with research students, on other topics, including: (i) identity and individuation of systems in quantum physics; (ii) dualities especially gauge/gravity duality; (iii) under-determination, and scientific realism, in modern cosmology.

Publications
Books

 Philosophy of Physics (Handbook of the Philosophy of Science) 2 volume set (ed. with John Earman), North Holland, 2006.
 Quantum Entanglements: Selected Papers of Rob Clifton (ed. with Hans Halverson), Oxford University Press, 2004.
 Non-Locality and Modality (ed. with Thomasz Placek), Kluwer Academic Publishing, 2002.
 The Arguments of Time (ed.), Oxford University Press, 2000.
 From Physics to Philosophy (ed. with Constantine Pagonis), Cambridge University Press 1999.
 Spacetime (ed. with Mark Hogarth and Gordon Belot), Dartmouth Publishing, 1996.
 Language, Mind and Logic (ed.), Cambridge University Press, 1984.

Research articles in journals
 Conceptual Aspects of Gauge/Gravity Duality, (with S. de Haro and D. Mayerson), forthcoming in "Foundations of Physics". 
 Comparing Dualities and Gauge Symmetries, (with S. de Haro and N. Teh), forthcoming in "Studies in History and Philosophy of Modern Physics". 
 On the Relation between Dualities and Gauge Symmetries, (with S. de Haro and N. Teh), forthcoming in Philosophy of Science.
 Assessing the Montevideo Interpretation of Quantum Mechanics, "Studies in History and Philosophy of Modern Physics", 52A, 2015, 75–85.
 On Emergence in Gauge Theories at the 't Hooft Limit, (with N. Bouatta), "European Journal for Philosophy of Science", 5, 2015, 55–87.
 On Under-determination in Cosmology, "Studies in History and Philosophy of Modern Physics", 46, 2014, 57–69.
 Reduction, Emergence and Renormalization, "The Journal of Philosophy", 111, 2014, 5–49.
 The Oxford Questions on Foundations of Quantum Physics, (with A. Briggs and A. Zeilinger), "Proceedings of the Royal Society (London)" A2013, 469, 20130299 –.
 Under-determination in cosmology: an invitation, "Aristotelian Society Supplementary Volume", 86, 2012, 1–18. 
 On Time chez Dummett, European Journal of Analytic Philosophy 8, 2012, 77–102.
 On Kinds of Indiscernibility in Logic and Metaphysics (with A. Caulton), British Journal for the Philosophy of Science 63, 2012, 27–84.
 Symmetries and Paraparticles as a Motivation for Structuralism (with A. Caulton), British Journal for the Philosophy of Science, 63, 2012, 233–285.
 Emergence, Reduction and Supervenience: A Varied Landscape, Foundations of Physics 41, 2011, 920–959.
 Less is Different: Emergence and Reduction Reconciled, Foundations of Physics 41, 2011, 1065–1135.
 Laws, Causation and Dynamics at different Levels, Interface Focus (Royal Society London) 1, 2011, 1–14.
 Stochastic Einstein Locality Revisited, British Journal for the Philosophy of Science 58, 2007, 805–867.
 Reconsidering Relativistic Causality, International Studies in the Philosophy of Science 21, 2007, –328.
 Against Pointillisme about Mechanics, British Journal for the Philosophy of Science 57, 2006, 709–754.
 The Rotating Discs Argument Defeated, British Journal for the Philosophy of Science 57, 2006, 1–45.
 On the Persistence of Particles, Foundations of Physics 35, 2005, 233–269.
 David Lewis Meets Hamilton and Jacobi, Philosophy of Science 71, 2004, 1095–1106.
 The End of Time? British Journal for the Philosophy of Science 53, 2002, 289–330.
 The State of Physics: Halfway through the Woods, The Journal of Soft Computing 5, 2001, 129–130.
 A Topos Perspective on the Kochen–Specker Theorem IV: Interval Valuations (with C. J. Isham), International Journal on Theoretical Physics 41, 2002, 141, 613–639.
 Some Possible Roles for Topos Theory in Quantum Theory and Quantum Gravity (with C. Isham), Foundations of Physics 30, 2000, 1707–1735.
 A Topos Perspective on the Kochen–Specker Theorem III: Von Neumann Algebras as the Base Category (with J. Hamilton and C. J. Isham), International Journal on Theoretical Physics 39, 2000, 1413–1416.
 A Topos Perspective on the Kochen–Specker Theorem II: Conceptual Aspects and Classical Analogues (with C. J. Isham), International Journal on Theoretical Physics 38, 1999, 827–859.
 A Topos Perspective on the Kochen–Specker Theorem I: Quantum States as Generalized Valuations (with C. J. Isham), International Journal on Theoretical Physics 11, 1998, 2669–2733.
 Whither the Minds, British Journal for the Philosophy of Science 47, 1996, 200–221.
 Is Algebraic Lorentz-Covariant Quantum Field Theory Stochastic Einstein Local? (with F. A. Muller), Philosophy of Science 61, 1994, 457–474.
 Interpretation and Identity in Quantum Theory, Studies in History and Philosophy of Science 24, 1993, 443–476.
 Forms of Probabilistic Ascriptions, International Journal of Theoretical Physics 32, 1993, 2271–2286
 Parameter Dependence and Outcome Dependence in Dynamical Models for State Vector Reduction (with C. Chirardi, R. Grassi and G. Fleming), Foundations of Physics 23, 1993, 341–364. (An improved version is in International Journal of Theoretical Physics 32, 1993, 2287–2304.)
 A Galois Connection Approach to Superposition and Inaccessibility (with J. Melia), International Journal of Theoretical Physics 32, 1993, 2305–2321.
 David Lewis Meets John Bell, Philosophy of Science 59, 1992, 26–43.
 Bell's Theorem: What it Takes, British Journal for the Philosophy of Science 43, 1992, 41–83.
 Probabilities and Conditionals: Distinctions by Example, Proceedings of the Aristotelian Society New Series 92, 1992, 251–272.
 Generalization of the Greenberger–Horne–Zeilinger Algebraic Proof of Nonlocality (with R. K. Clifton and M. L. G. Redhead), Foundations of Physics 21, 1991, 149–184.
 A Second Look at a Recent Algebraic Proof of Nonlocality (with R. K. Clifton, M. L. G. Redhead), Foundations of Physics Letters 4, 1991, 395–403.
 Nonlocal Influences and Possible Worlds—A Stapp in the Wrong Direction (with R. K. Clifton, M. L. G. Redhead), British Journal for the Philosophy of Science 41, 1990, 5–48.
 Causal Independence in EPR Arguments, PSA: Proceedings of the Biennial Meeting of the Philosophy of Science Association 1990, 213–225.
 The Hole Truth, British Journal for the Philosophy of Science 40, 1989, 1–28.
 Albert Einstein Meets David Lewis, PSA: Proceedings of the Biennial Meeting of the Philosophy of Science Association, 1988, 65–81 [Reprinted in: Spacetime, 1996, eds. J. Butterfield, G. Belot and M. Hogarth, International Research Library of Philosophy, Dartmouth Publishing].
 Determinism and Substantivalism, International Studies in Philosophy of Science 2, 1988, 10–32.
 Do the Bell Inequalities Require the Existence of Joint Probability Distributions? (with G. Svetlichny, M. L. G. Readhead and H. Brown), Philosophy of Science 55, 1988, 387–401.
 Substantivalism and Determinism, International Studies in the Philosophy of Science 2, 1987, 10–32.
 Predicate Modifiers in Tense Logic (with C. Stirling), Logique et Analyse 117, 1987, 31–50.
 Determinism and Probability in Physics (with P. Clark), Proceedings of the Aristotelian Society Supplementary Volumes 61, 1987, 185–243.
 Probability and Disturbing Measurement, Proceedings of the Aristotelian Society Supplementary Volumes 61, 1987, 211–243.
 Spatial and Temporal Parts, The Philosophical Quarterly 35, 1985, 32–44 [Reprinted in: Identity, 1993, ed. H. Noonan, International Research Library of Philosophy, Dartmouth Publishing].
 Relationism and Possible Worlds, British Journal for the Philosophy of Science 35, 1984, 101–113.
 On Spurious Egocentricity, Analysis 44, 1984, 25–29.
 Seeing the Present, Mind 270, 1984, 161–176 [Reprinted in: Questions of Time and Tense, 1998, ed. R, LePoidevin, Oxford University Press].
 Dummett on Temporal Operators, The Philosophical Quarterly 34, 1984, 31–43.
 Prior's Conception of Time, Proceedings of the Aristotelian Society New Series 84, 1984, 193–209.

Research contributions in books
 Scientific Realism and Primordial Cosmology, (with F. Azhar), abridged version forthcoming in "The Routledge Handbook of Scientific Realism", 2017, ed. J Saatsi, Routledge; https://arxiv.org/abs/1606.04071; http://philsci-archive.pitt.edu/12192/. 
 Renormalization for Philosophers, in "Metaphysics in Contemporary Physics", 2015, eds. T. Bigaj and C. Wuethrich (Poznan Studies in Philosophy of Sciences and Humanities, vol 104; Rodopi), 437–485.
 The Emergence of Integrability in Gauge Theories (with N. Bouatta), in "EPSA11 Perspectives and Foundational Problems in Philosophy of Science", 2014, eds.V. Karakostas and D. Dieks, (The European Philosophy of Science Association Proceedings II), Springer, 229–238.
 On Time in Quantum Physics, in "The Blackwell Companion to the Philosophy of Time", 2013, eds. A. Bardon and H. Dyke, Wiley-Blackwell, 220–241.
 Emergence and Reduction Combined in Phase Transitions (with N. Bouatta), in Proceedings of Frontiers of Fundamental Physics 11 (American Institute of Physics), 2012, eds. J. Kouneiher, C. Barbachoux and D. Vey, American Institute of Physics Conference Proceedings 1446, 383–403.
 Against Pointillisme: a Call to Arms, in Explanation, Prediction and Confirmation, 2011, eds. D. Dieks, W. Gonzalez, S. Hartmann, T. Uebel and M. Weber, Springer, 347–366.
 On Symmetry and Conserved Quantities in Classical Mechanics, in Physical Theory and its Interpretation, 2006, eds. W. Demopoulos and I. Pitowsky, Springer, 43–99.
 On Symplectic Reduction in Classical Mechanics, in The Handbook of Philosophy of Physics, 2006, eds. J. Butterfield and J. Earman, North Holland, 1–131.
 Against Pointillisme about Geometry, in Time and History, Proceedings of 28th International Wittgenstein Conference, 2006, eds. F. Stadler and M. Stoeltzner, Ontos Verlag, 181–222.
 On Hamilton–Jacobi Theory as a Classical Root of Theory, in Quo Vadis Quantum Mechanics?, 2004, eds. A. Elitzur, S. Dolev and N. Kolenda, Springer, 239–273.
 Some Aspects of Modality in Analytical Mechanics, in Formale Teleologie und Kausalitat in der Physik, 2004, eds. P. Weingartner and M. Stoeltzner, Mentis, 160–198.
 Topos Theory as a Framework for Partial Truth, in the Scope of Logic, Methodology and Philosophy of Science (volume 1), 2002, eds. P. Gardenfors, K. Kijania-Placek and J. Wolenski, Kluwer Academic Publishing, 307–329.
 Some Worlds of Quantum Theory, in Quantum Mechanics (Scientific Perspectives on Divine Action vol 5), eds. R.J. Russell, P. Clayton, K. Wegter-McNelly, and J. Polkinghorne, Vatican Observatory Publications, 111–140.
 Spacetime and the Philosophical Challenge of Quantum Gravity, in Physics meets Philosophy at the Planck Scale, 2001, eds. C. Callender and N. Huggett, Cambridge University Press, 33–89.
 On the Emergence of Time in Quantum Gravity (with C. Isham), in The Arguments of Time, 1991, ed. J. Butterfield, Oxford University Press, 111–168.
 Strange Positions (with G. Fleming), in From Physics to Philosophy''', 1999, eds. J. Butterfield and C. Pagonis, Cambridge University Press, 108–165.
 Quantum Curiosities of Psychophysics, in Consciousness and Human Identity, 1998, ed. J. Cornwell, Oxford University Press, 122–157.
 Vacuum Correlations and Outcome Dependence in Algebraic Quantum Field Theory, in Fundamental Problems in Quantum Theory, Annals of the New York Academy of Sciences, 1995, eds. D. Greenberger and A. Zeilinger, Proceedings of a conference in honour of John Wheeler, 768–785.
 Outcome Dependence and Stochastic Einstein Nonlocality, in Logic and Philosophy of Science in Uppsala (Selected Papers from the 9th International Congress of Logic Methodology and Philosophy of Science), 1994, eds. D. Prawitz and D. Westerdahl, Kluwer, 385–424.
 Is there Superluminal Causation in Quantum Theory? (with G. Fleming), in Bell's Theorem and the Foundations of Modern Physics, 1992, eds. A. van der Merwe, F. Selleri and G. Tarozzi, World Scientific, 203–207.
 A Spacetime Approach to the Bell Inequality, in Philosophical Consequences of Quantum Theory, 1989, eds. J. Cushing and E. McMullin, University of Notre Dame Press, 114–144.
 Content and Context, in Language, Mind and Logic, 1986, ed. J. Butterfield, Cambridge University Press, 91–122.
 Indexicals and Tense, in Exercises in Analysis, 1984, ed. I. Hacking, Cambridge University Press, 69–87.
 Measurement, Unitarity and Laws, in Space, Time and Causality'', 1982, ed. R. Swinburne, Reidel, 135–147.

References

Fellows of Trinity College, Cambridge
Fellows of All Souls College, Oxford
Living people
Philosophers of science
Philosophical cosmologists
1954 births
Fellows of the British Academy